Lindsay Davenport and Jana Novotná were the defending champions but only Davenport competed that year with Monica Seles.

Davenport and Seles lost in the second round to Sandra Cacic and Mary Pierce.

Cacic and Pierce won in the final 7–6, 4–6, 7–6 against Barbara Schett and Patty Schnyder.

Seeds
Champion seeds are indicated in bold text while text in italics indicates the round in which those seeds were eliminated. The top four seeded teams received byes into the second round.

Draw

Final

Top half

Bottom half

External links
 ITF tournament edition details

Amelia Island Championships
1998 WTA Tour